Carrot latent virus (CtLV) is a plant pathogenic virus of the family Rhabdoviridae.

External links
ICTVdB - The Universal Virus Database: Carrot latent virus
Family Groups - The Baltimore Method

Viral plant pathogens and diseases
Nucleorhabdoviruses